Coombe Monthly is an online publication covering news in the Royal Borough of Kingston upon Thames, South West London. It is run by local residents in the borough, and is free to access.

It is available as a free, paperless Coombe Monthly e-newspaper, accessible from their website and delivered straight to email inboxes each morning.

The paper also organises local community events, with the aim of "Engaging local residents in the issues around them", known as 'Kingston Question Time' events. These events donate all proceeds to Love Kingston, a local charity in the Royal Borough of Kingston Upon Thames, donating to 'Pathways out of Poverty'.

The newspaper is run by James Giles, a New Malden resident, who has been listed by the Surrey Comet as a local Unsung Hero.

References

Coombe Monthly

London newspapers
Media and communications in the Royal Borough of Kingston upon Thames